Reiko Sakamoto (born 1939) is a Japanese mathematician affiliated with Nara Women's University. Her teachers have included Sigeru Mizohata and 
Masaya Yamaguchi; her students have included Yoshihiro Shibata. She is known for her research on mixed boundary conditions for hyperbolic partial differential equations, for which she won the 1974 Iyanaga Prize of the Mathematical Society of Japan, and for her book on hyperbolic boundary value problems.

References

Year of birth missing (living people)
Living people
Japanese mathematicians
Japanese women mathematicians